Rågsveds IF is a Swedish football club located in Hagsätra.

Background
Rågsveds IF will start 2015 playing in Division 4 Stockholm Södra which is the sixth tier of Swedish football. Woman squad will start playing in Division 3 which is fifth tier in Swedish football. Rågsveds IF play their home matches at the Hagsätra IP in Hagsätra.

The club is affiliated to Stockholms Fotbollförbund.

Season to season

Footnotes

External links
 Rågsveds IF – Official website

Football clubs in Stockholm
1958 establishments in Sweden